Mark Silcox is a comedian and actor who has been performing since 2008. He is most known for being a stand-up, making it to the finals of the BBC New Comedy Award in 2013 and being one of several Asian comedians to be featured on BBC's The Big Asian Stand-Up, as well as for his starring role as Joe Lycett's assistant on the Channel 4 consumer rights comedy show Joe Lycett's Got Your Back.

Early life
Silcox grew up in India, where he received a Master's degree in Chemistry and worked as a lecturer. He moved to Great Britain in 1990, and completed a PhD in Analytical Chemistry at Imperial College London.

Career
A part-time teacher, Silcox is known for his experimental, deadpan style of anti-humour.

Silcox originally began performing in 2008 after attending a stand-up comedy course from City Lit. After 50 gigs, he moved to Germany to focus on a career in science, returning to the UK to start gigging again in 2012.

Since 2012, he has appeared on Channel 4's An Immigrant's Guide to Britain, The Big Asian Stand-Up on BBC, and Romesh Ranganathan's Comedians in Pubs Talking Comedy on BBC Three.

In 2018, Silcox starred in three episodes of the gritty YouTube mini-series, 'Silcox Investigates', where he played a Private Investigator. The remaining three episodes are due to be filmed in 2020.

In 2019, Silcox began appearing as Joe Lycett’s sidekick on Channel 4's Joe Lycett's Got Your Back, with a clip of him challenging Burger King on their motto "Have it your way" going viral and prompting a response from Burger King themselves.

As an actor, Silcox has appeared on Man Like Mobeen, Sick of It and The Luke McQueen Pilots.

He has performed a show at the Edinburgh Fringe every year since 2014.

Silcox was a BBC New Comedy Award finalist in 2013.

In 2019, Silcox was featured as Sir Edwin Herbert, Baron Tangley in Jay Foreman's Unfinished London series.

In 2020, Silcox played the role of Raj in “The Telethon”, an update written by and starring George Vere, for the video game Not For Broadcast.

In 2022, Silcox played the role of Edgar, one of the retail assistants at the Peterborough branch of Sports Depot, in the 3 part comedy mini-series Sneakerhead, broadcast on Dave in the UK.

Television credits

References 

Year of birth missing (living people)
Living people
21st-century British comedians
British male comedians
Place of birth missing (living people)
Nationality missing
Alumni of Imperial College London
British stand-up comedians
21st-century British male actors
British male television actors
Indian emigrants to the United Kingdom
British male actors of Indian descent